Between Anglo-Saxon times and the nineteenth century Bedfordshire was divided for administrative purposes into 9 hundreds, plus the borough of Bedford. Each hundred had a separate council that met each month to rule on local judicial and taxation matters.

The Domesday Survey of 1086 lists three additional half hundreds, Stanburge, Buchelai and Weneslai, which had by the 14th century become parts of the hundreds of Manshead, Willey and Biggleswade respectively.

Each hundred had a bailiff; the names of some bailiffs in 1349 were: Thomas Cammull, for Manshead, with Walter Sporoun, a former bailiff; John de Lynbotesshaye, for Flete; Edward atte Haye, for Redbournestok; Walter le Longe, for Wyley.

Until 1574 one sheriff covered Bedfordshire and Buckinghamshire, the shire court of the former being held at Bedford. The jurisdiction of the hundred courts, with the exception of Flitt, remained in the king's possession. Flitt was parcel of the manor of Luton, and formed part of the marriage portion of Eleanor, sister of Henry III and wife of William Marshall.

Parishes

At the start of the 19th century, the hundreds contained the following parishes:

Three of the parishes above were in fact historically part of Huntingdonshire until they were incorporated into Bedfordshire in the late 19th century, though each was considered part of a Bedfordshire hundred. Eaton Socon fell into Barford hundred, Everton in Biggleswade hundred, and Tilbrook in Stodden hundred.

References

See also
History of Bedfordshire
List of hundreds of England and Wales

 
Bedfordshire